Francis Neef (1770–1854) was an educational reformer and pedagogue, who founded the first Pestalozzian school in the United States and published the first book in English on teaching method there.

Life 
Francis Joseph Nicholas Neef was born in 1770 in Alsace, and grew up speaking both French and German. Intending at first to enter the priesthood, he also learned Latin, Greek, and Italian, but was inspired by the French Revolution to join the French army in 1791. While recovering from wounds received in 1796, Neef read the works of Swiss educationist Johann Heinrich Pestalozzi. Pestalozzi's ideals of achieving equality and liberty through educational reform appealed to Neef, who was inspired to become a teacher.

In 1800, Pestalozzi opened a school in Burgdorf, Switzerland, which broke with European and American traditions of rote learning and recitation, focusing instead on allowing children to pursue their curiosity. His method called for the creation of a nurturing environment, in which children were able to learn and develop at their own pace, led by the teacher. Neef visited the school, and was hired as a language teacher. After three years of training, he was sent to Paris to open a school there.

In 1805, geologist and philanthropist William Maclure visited the school in Paris, and offered to pay the salary of a teacher who would open a Pestalozzian school in the United States. Neef accepted, spending two years learning English before opening his school outside Philadelphia. The school, five miles out of the city, emphasised time spent outside and exercise. In the same year, he published Sketch of a Plan and Method of Education...Suitable for the Offspring of a Free People, and for All Rational Beings (1808). The book explained the Pestalozzian method, which was grounded in observation and discussion.

In 1812, Neef was elected to the Academy of Natural Sciences. In 1813, the school was moved to Delaware, and the following year to Kentucky. In 1823, Neef travelled on the "Boatload of Knowledge" to Robert Owen's settlement at New Harmony, Indiana. In 1826, Owen invited Neef to New Harmony to run the school there, which he accepted. After the failure of the New Harmony experiment, Neef established a school in Cincinnati, returning to New Harmony in 1834.

Francis Neef died in 1854.

References 

1770 births
1854 deaths
American educational theorists